Nicole Pratt and Meghann Shaughnessy were the defending champions, but decided not to participate this year.

Samantha Reeves and Adriana Serra Zanetti won the title, defeating Klára Koukalová and Alena Vašková 7–5, 4–6, 6–3 in the final.

Seeds

Draw

References
Main Draw

Challenge Bell
Tournoi de Québec
Can